Billardia is a genus of cnidarians belonging to the family Lafoeidae.

The species of this genus are found in primarily in Antarctica and Australia.

Species:

Billardia hyalina 
Billardia intermedia 
Billardia novaezealandiae 
Billardia subrufa

References

Lafoeidae
Hydrozoan genera